Bywaters is a surname in the English language. People whose family name is or was Bywaters include:

 Frederick Bywaters (1902–1923), British man executed for murder
 Eric Bywaters (1910–2003), British physician
 Gabe Bywaters (died 2004), Australian politician
 Jerry Bywaters (1906–1989), American artist, university professor, museum director, art critic and historian
 Stella Bywaters (1919–2009), Australian brigadier in the Salvation Army
 Zakiya Bywaters (born 1991), American professional soccer

See also
Bywaters' syndrome or Crush syndrome, named for Eric Bywaters

English-language surnames